Maedagawa Katsu (born Katsuro Takahashi; February 9, 1939 – November 4, 1998) was a sumo wrestler from Esashi, Iwate, Japan. He made his professional debut in September 1952, and reached the top division in November 1960. His highest rank was sekiwake. He retired from active competition in May 1967.

Career record
The Kyushu tournament was first held in 1957, and the Nagoya tournament in 1958.

See also
Glossary of sumo terms
List of past sumo wrestlers
List of sekiwake
List of sumo tournament top division runners-up

References

1939 births
Japanese sumo wrestlers
Sumo people from Iwate Prefecture
Sekiwake
1998 deaths